Forlev-Vemmelev, also known under the individual names Forlev and Vemmelev, is a town in Zealand, Denmark. It is located in Slagelse Municipality. The two towns of Forlev and Vemmelev have grown together, with the merged town known under all three names. The Statistics Denmark refer to the town as Forlev while Slagelse Municipality refer to it as Vemmelev. Forlev-Vemmelev is located 5 km south-west of Slagelse and 8 km north-east of Korsør.

The northern part of the town is Forlev and the southern part is Vemmelev. The E20 motorway cuts through the two parts of the town, with a bridge connecting them.

History
Between 1856 and 1962 a train station was located in Forlev. Forlev was a stop on the West line.

Notable residents 
 Christian "Klumben" Andersen (born 1987), musician

References

Cities and towns in Region Zealand
Slagelse Municipality